Roba da ricchi (Stuff for rich people) is a 1987 Italian anthology comedy film directed by Sergio Corbucci. It consists of three segments, all set in Monte Carlo.

Plot  
Against the backdrop of Monte Carlo (where the film was shot) three different stories intertwine:

I episode

Attilio Carbone, a clumsy insurer, after having recklessly insured a dog against the damage caused to it, in order not to be fired must be able to pay the owner the least possible compensation.
However, he will be seduced by the busty Dora who will convince him to have her husband take out a large life insurance policy and then kill him and pocket the insurance money; the woman, who is also in league with her husband, will end up cheating both of them, pocketing the money and abandoning them on a desert island.

II episode

On advice from the family doctor, agree to arrange a meeting between the two.
While he finds himself at the height of despair at the thought of his wife with each other, Mapi will make him believe that Napoleon is homosexual and that it was all a plan to punish him for constant flings. They will promise each other loyalty, but in reality Napoleon is neither gay nor a busker, and he is really Mapi's lover, who will even give him a yacht. Petruzzelli too, however, will continue with his escapades.

III episode

Don Vittorino, returning from a trip to Lourdes with some parishioners, is blocked in Monte Carlo, as he is the striking copy of the man who disturbs the dreams of Princess Topazia. Under pressure from her future husband, from the psychiatrist who is treating her, from a monsignor and from Pope John Paul II himself, he agrees to impersonate the man, in an attempt to reproduce the princess's recurring dream.
The staging, albeit with various obstacles and misunderstandings, will come to fruition. Don Vittorino is also appointed spiritual advisor to the princess with the joyful approval of the new husband and the parents of both spouses, but in reality, for Topazia, it is just an excuse to have him as a lover.

Cast 
 First segment  
Paolo Villaggio: Carbone
Serena Grandi: Dora  
Maurizio Micheli: Guidobaldo  
Aldo Ralli: Director

 Second segment  
Lino Banfi: Commendator Petruzzelli 
Laura Antonelli: Mapi 
Milena Vukotic: Friend of Mapi
Maurizio Fabbri: Napoleon
Claudia Gerini: Daughter of Petruzzelli

 Third segment  
Renato Pozzetto: Don Vittorino
Francesca Dellera: Princess Topazia 
Vittorio Caprioli:  Bishop 
Enzo Garinei: Topazia's Psychiatrist

See also    
 List of Italian films of 1987

References

External links

1980 films
1980 comedy films
1980s Italian-language films
Films directed by Sergio Corbucci
Italian comedy films
Films set in Monaco
1980s Italian films